Gorey is a market town in north County Wexford, Ireland. It is beside the main M11 Dublin to Wexford road. The town is also connected to the railway network along the same route. Local newspapers include the Gorey Guardian.

As a growing commuter town to Dublin for some residents, there has been an increase in population in the early 21st century. Between 1996 and 2002, the population of the surrounding district grew by 23%, and the town itself more than doubled in population (from 3,939 to 9,822 inhabitants) in the 20 years between the 1996 and 2016 census.

History

Among the earliest recordings of the parish and town of Gorey, also sometimes historically known as Kilmichaelogue, are Norman records from 1296 which record an existing town on the site. Several centuries later, in 1619, the town was granted a charter as a borough, under the name Newborough. However, as noted by cartographer Samuel Lewis and publisher George Henry Bassett, this name "never [grew] into general use" as the "inhabitants did not take kindly to the name chosen for the town". The borough charter had been obtained by the then Bishop of Ferns and Leighlin, Thomas Ram (1564–1634).

Together with other developments in the area, and as the principal local landlords, the Ram family built a large estate to the north of the town. The manor house of this estate, Ramsfort, was burned following the Irish Rebellion of 1641, and again during the Irish Rebellion of 1798. Ramsfort house was rebuilt in the 19th century to designs attributed to architect Daniel Robertson.

In addition to Gorey's 18th century market house, many of the larger buildings within the town itself date to the mid-19th century. These include Gorey railway station which dates to 1863, the Church of Ireland church (Kilmakilloge) dating to 1861, and the Roman Catholic church (dedicated to Saint Michael) completed in 1843. Gorey was the centre of several conflicts during the 1798 Rebellion, and a memorial to these events was erected in the town in the rebellion's centenary year (1898).

The parents of Jim Bolger, the former Prime Minister of New Zealand, emigrated from Gorey in the 1930s.

Amenities

The town marked the 150th anniversary of the consecration of Christ Church (Kilmakilloge) in 2011. The church, which was completed in 1861, was designed by James Welland, one of the provincial architects of the Ecclesiastical Commissioners of the Church of Ireland. Its stained glass windows were designed by Harry Clarke and Catherine O'Brien.

Sport 
Naomh Éanna was founded in 1970 by a group of Christian Brothers. Naomh Éanna's club ground is called Pairc uí Síochain located at the top of Clonattin Gorey Co.Wexford. Naomh Éanna won their first senior hurling county title in 2018.

There are also two soccer clubs located in the town: Gorey Rangers and Gorey Celtic. Gorey Rangers are located at The Showgrounds and Ramstown, while Gorey Celtic are located in Mullaunfin Creagh on the outskirts of the town.

Gorey Rugby Club is located at Clonattin. Former players include Nick Popplewell and Robin Copeland.

Education
Gorey's largest secondary school, Gorey Community School has over 1,500 students. In 2012 another post-primary school, Creagh College opened to accommodate Gorey's increased population of secondary school students. Then, in 2021 an Educate Together Secondary School opened for only 34 new First Years in temporary portacabins. Five local primary schools, Gorey Educate Together National School,  Gorey Loreto Primary, Saint Joseph's Primary, Gorey Central School and Gaelscoil Moshíológ Guaire feed the secondary schools in Gorey, as do a number of schools in the surrounding area. Gorey School of Art is Post Leaving Certificate school for the arts.

The library in Gorey opened its doors in 2011 - after a decade of plans to build it.

Transport
Gorey railway station opened on 16 November 1863. It is located on the Dublin to Rosslare Europort line.

The town lies on the N11 road route (Dublin-to-Rosslare) and, until a by-pass was opened in June 2007, local traffic congestion was an issue. The by-pass is a 23-kilometre-long high standard dual carriageway and was upgraded to motorway status in August 2009.

Several bus services serve Gorey. Bus Éireann route 002 links the town with Dublin Airport and Rosslare Harbour, while route 006 links Gorey with Dublin and Waterford. Ardcavan also operate a daily service linking Gorey with Dublin.

Wexford Bus operates a service linking Gorey with Dublin Airport. In addition, Gorey Bus Links operate two local routes, one linking Gorey with Ballycanew, Ballygarrett and Courtown, with another linking the town with Ballymoney, Castletown and Inch.

Media and entertainment
The Gorey Guardian is the local newspaper.

Gorey has had a local theatre group since the 1950s, which hosts a number of performances annually from its 300-seat auditorium.

Gorey Musical Society has one production a year, and its 2007 staging of Oklahoma! received the 'Best Overall Show' award at the Association of Irish Musical Societies awards in Killarney.

Gorey Choral Group, a mixed-voice choir founded in the 1970s, has participated in a number of contests and won the first plan in the jazz and popular music section of the 2016 Cork International Choral Festival.

For 15 years during the 1970s and early 1980s, the Gorey Arts Festival, organised by local artist Paul Funge, was held in the town during the summer. Performers at the festival included U2, Horslips, Chris de Burgh, Christy Moore, Planxty, Makem and Clancy,
Niall Tóibín and Eamon Morrissey.

Every year, varying from late July to early August, Gorey's main street closes over several days for the Market House Festival.

There are a number of pubs, bars, and nightclub in the town. A seven-screen cinema is located on the Courtown road.

People 

 Paul Boyle, Connacht and Ireland rugby union player
 Billy Byrne, former hurler and All-Ireland winner
 Robin Copeland, Munster, Connacht and Ireland rugby union player
 Ger Cushe, former hurler and All-Ireland winner
 Michael W. D'Arcy, politician
 James Godkin, author and journalist
 Herbert F. Hore, historian, author and archaeologist
 Conor McDonald, hurler
 Darragh McDonald, former paralympic gold medalist in swimming
 Colm O'Gorman, director of Amnesty International Ireland
Alanna O'Kelly, artist, born in Gorey
 Aisling O'Neill, actress, lives in Gorey

Town twinning 
Gorey is twinned with Oban in Scotland.

See also
 List of towns and villages in Ireland
 Market Houses in Ireland

References

External links

 Gorey Chamber of Commerce

 
Towns and villages in County Wexford